AC Transit is a public transit agency that operates 131 bus lines throughout the East Bay region of California. The agency also administers the Dumbarton Express lines, but operation of those lines was transferred to MV Transportation on December 19, 2011. AC Transit provides extensive local bus service to 17 cities in Alameda and Contra Costa Counties and the city of Milpitas in Santa Clara County. Transbay bus service is also provided to San Francisco and Palo Alto in Santa Clara County.

Route summary
AC Transit bus routes are arranged in seven categories (six numbered, one lettered). Since its inception in 1960, AC Transit has used both numbers and letters to distinguish routes. Many Transbay rail lines were inherited from the Key System and converted to bus routes, and AC Transit continued to use letters to identify the routes. Many Transbay routes continue to follow the original Key System alignments to some degree. The number and letter ranges listed below do not mean that all numbers or letters within a range are in use.

Numbered routes operate within the East Bay:
 1-99 primarily serve the northwestern part of Contra Costa County and most of Alameda County.
 200-299 serve the southern part of Alameda County and Milpitas.
 300-399 serve combined portions of other bus lines, usually only at certain times of day or certain days of the week.
 600-699 operate primarily on school days only.
 700-799 are Early Bird Express lines, which are replacing early-morning BART service during a seismic retrofit of the Transbay Tube
 800-899 are part of the All Nighter network, which provides bus service during owl hours and at times when BART is not operating.

One- and two-digit route numbers are sometimes used as a "base" number for three-digit route numbers. For example, Route 339 is "based" on Route 39.

Lettered routes (A-Z) provide Transbay service (i.e., service across a bridge) between the East Bay and San Francisco, San Mateo, and Santa Clara Counties.

Suffixes (also lettered) are used to distinguish variations in route alignments. Currently, A, B, C, L, M, R, S, and X are used. Some suffixes have specific meanings:
 C denotes Combined service, where portions of two or more routes are combined into a single route. Used on Routes LC and NXC.
 L denotes Limited stop service, where not all local stops are served. Used on Routes 46L and NL.
 R denotes Rapid service, which is limited-stop service with some bus rapid transit characteristics. Used on Route 72R.
 X denotes Express service, where portions of the main route are skipped entirely. Used on Routes NX, NX1, NX2, NX3, NX4, NXC, and OX.

Supplemental numerical suffixes are used to differentiate route variations for lines that already use a lettered suffix. This is the case with the NX lines listed above.

Note: Routes listed below are current as of 19 January 2019. (must be updated for 2020 changes)

Local service

These routes serve various cities, towns, and attractions in Alameda and Contra Costa Counties. One route also serves Milpitas in Santa Clara County. Several routes provide deviations on select trips, where a bus serves a particular business or school that is not on the regular route. 

Historically, Route 51 has been considered the busiest bus route in the East Bay, connecting the cities of Berkeley, Oakland, and Alameda. However, this route was split into Routes 51A and 51B in March 2010.

In early 2015, following several rounds of community meetings, AC Transit announced a proposal for a radical rerouting and redesignation of many lines throughout their service area due to extra funds made available by the passage of Measure BB in November 2014. Called AC Go, the program looks at redesigning bus lines throughout the system to reflect the changing traveling habits of its residents by providing more frequent service on its busiest lines while rerouting others to better serve adjoining communities.

Notes: 
 Route 73 runs at all times despite not officially being a part of the All Nighter network.
 Route 275 was deleted on March 26, 2017 and was replaced by a one-year trial of the Newark FLEX (see below).

Rapid service
For an explanation of bus rapid transit, click here.

Tempo is the branded bus rapid transit service operated by AC Transit. There is one additional Rapid route.

These routes provide the following amenities and features:
 Frequent service
 Stop spacing every 
 Passenger shelters with Tempo or Rapid branding
 Transit Signal Priority (TSP) so buses spend less time waiting at traffic signals

Broadway Shuttle
The Broadway Shuttle, also known as The Free B, is a free shuttle service operating along Broadway in downtown Oakland as part of the Meet Downtown Oakland program. Service is operated by AC Transit under contract with the City of Oakland. Funding is provided by the City of Oakland, Alameda County Transportation Commission, and Bay Area Air Quality Management District with additional sponsorships from Jack London Square, Jack London Improvement District, Downtown Oakland Association, and Lake Merritt-Uptown District Association.

The Broadway Shuttle began in August 2010 and was expanded twice, first in July 2011 and again in December 2014. Late-night Friday and all Saturday service was discontinued in August 2017. The B operates two routes:

Special service
Several special service routes, numbered between 300 and 399, cater to various purposes:
 Routes 314 and 356 provide midday shopper service, connecting residential neighborhoods and senior homes with shopping centers and major attractions.
 Other routes combine popular segments of two or more regular routes and operate evenings and/or weekends when ridership is insufficient to support the regular routes.

FLEX service

In 2016, AC Transit started operating two FLEX services that provide on-demand van service to riders in Castro Valley and Newark. These services require passengers to book their trips online, using a smartphone app, or by telephone (up to three months in advance), and vans arrive within 30 minutes after the reservation is made. Customers boarding at a BART station do not need to reserve a trip and can just tell the operator their final destination. Fares are identical to the local fares, and Clipper cards are accepted. These services operate Mondays to Fridays from 6am to 8pm (except holidays).

Early Bird Express
On February 11, 2019, the beginning of BART service on weekdays was changed from 4:00 am to 5:00 am for a three-year period to allow for overnight seismic retrofit work in the Transbay Tube. Thirteen Early Bird Express routes, of which six are operated by AC Transit, were created to provide service between 3:50 am and 5:30 am. The AC Transit-run routes provide Transbay service to the Temporary Transbay Terminal.

Transbay service
These routes cross San Francisco Bay and connect the East Bay with San Francisco, San Mateo, and Santa Clara Counties. All routes except Route 800 are lettered. (Route 800 is part of the All Nighter network and is listed in its respective section.) Most Transbay routes operate weekdays only during commute periods; two routes operate throughout the day on weekdays only and three routes operate daily. Most commute-only routes operate westbound from the East Bay in the morning and eastbound to the East Bay in the afternoon, but some service is provided in the reverse commute direction.

Serving San Francisco
All bus routes serving San Francisco cross the San Francisco–Oakland Bay Bridge and terminate at the Salesforce Transit Center (at the third floor).

Service via the San Mateo Bridge
One route operates between the East Bay and San Mateo County via the San Mateo Bridge.

Service via the Dumbarton Bridge
AC Transit operates one route between the East Bay and Santa Clara County via the Dumbarton Bridge. Additional bus service across the Dumbarton Bridge is provided by Dumbarton Express, which is a Transbay bus service provided under a consortium of five transit operators (AC Transit, BART, SamTrans, Union City Transit, and VTA). Dumbarton Express was operated by AC Transit through December 16, 2011 before being transferred to a contractor.

School service
A series of routes serve a variety of public and private middle, junior high, and high schools in Alameda and Contra Costa Counties. These routes generally operate only when school is in session. While these lines are open to all riders at regular fares, they do not operate during most school breaks and holidays. Some regular local bus routes also provide supplemental school service to nearby schools. These routes are usually timed to match the morning and afternoon bell schedules of all schools served.

There are 46 school routes numbered between 600 and 699: 604, 605, 606, 607, 611, 617, 620, 621, 623, 624, 625, 626, 628, 629, 631, 638, 642, 646, 648, 649, 650, 652, 653, 654, 655, 657, 658, 660, 662, 663, 667, 668, 669, 671, 672, 675, 676, 677, 679, 680, 681, 682, 684, 687, 688, and 696.

All Nighter service
Several transit agencies in the Bay Area, including AC Transit, participate in the All Nighter program. All Nighter buses provide overnight bus service when BART and Caltrain are not operating. AC Transit Route 800 is the backbone of this network, serving eleven or thirteen BART and four Muni Metro stations en route.

All AC Transit All Nighter routes provide timed transfers at Broadway and 14th Street in downtown Oakland. Most routes operate daily including holidays, generally from midnight to 5:00 AM. Weekend morning service on Routes 800 and 801 extends until 6 AM on Saturdays and 8 AM on Sundays, corresponding to the start of BART service for the day.

References

External links
 
 

Bus transportation in California
AC
AC
Public transportation in Alameda County, California
Public transportation in Contra Costa County, California
Public transportation in San Francisco
Public transportation in San Mateo County, California
Public transportation in Santa Clara County, California
AC
AC
Transit agencies in California
Transportation in Oakland, California